Karaekşi Nature Park ( or  more formally, Karaekşi Nature Park and Trout Hatchery ) is  a nature park in Mersin Province, Turkey

It was declared a nature park by the Ministry of Forest and Water Management in 2011. The park is in a forest of plane trees and Turkish pines. It stretches along a creek flowing into Göksu River. There are trout ponds, restaurants, children parks, a parking lot etc. in Karaekşi.

References

Nature parks in Turkey
Fish hatcheries
Mut District
2011 establishments in Turkey
Protected areas established in  2011
Parks in Mersin Province